Stony Brook Wildlife Sanctuary is a wildlife sanctuary in Norfolk, Massachusetts. It is among a network of sanctuaries with the Massachusetts Audubon Society. The 107-acre sanctuary is adjacent to the 140-acre Bristol Blake State Reservation. Both areas are managed by the Department of Conservation and Recreation (DCR). A  trail starts around by encircling Stony Pond and ends by a waterfall at the site of a former mill. The trail is wheelchair accessible and includes a 525-foot long boardwalk, installed in 2017, that allows visitors to view birds, wildlife, and the wetland habitat over Teal Marsh and Kingfisher Pond. Wildlife found there includes turtles, ducks, geese, great blue herons, and muskrats. The sanctuary also has natural history exhibits, programming space, a gift shop, nature play area, a picnic area, and a butterfly garden.

References

Further reading

External links
 Stony Brook Wildlife Sanctuary, video tour

Wildlife sanctuaries of the United States
Massachusetts Audubon Society
Protected areas of Norfolk County, Massachusetts
Wildlife refuges in Massachusetts
Nature centers in Massachusetts